Mubarak Wakaso (born 25 July 1990) is a Ghanaian footballer who plays for Belgian club Eupen, on loan from Shenzhen, and the Ghana national team as a midfielder.

He spent the better part of his career in Spain, starting out at Elche in 2008 and going on to also represent Villarreal, Espanyol, Las Palmas, Granada and Alavés. He also competed professionally in Russia, Scotland, Greece, China and Belgium.

Wakaso appeared with the Ghana national team at the 2014 World Cup, as well as five Africa Cup of Nations tournaments.

Club career

Early years and Spain
Born in Tamale, Northern Region, Wakaso began his senior career in Ashanti Gold SC. In 2008, he moved abroad and signed with Elche CF in Spain on a five-year contract, but only joined the club nearly two months later, however, due to international duty.

In late January 2011, after several bouts of indiscipline and internal codes violations, Wakaso was released by the Valencians. Shortly after, he joined another side in the region and Segunda División, Villarreal CF's B team.

On 27 February 2011, Wakaso made his La Liga debut, coming on as a substitute for José Catalá in the last minutes of a 2–2 away draw against Racing de Santander. He only played six matches in his first full season, and the Yellow Submarine was also relegated after 12 years in the top flight.

Wakaso signed for RCD Espanyol on 11 July 2012, penning a four-year contract. He started in 23 of his league appearances for the Catalans in his only season.

Rubin Kazan
In the last days of the 2013 summer transfer window, Wakaso moved to the Russian Premier League with FC Rubin Kazan. On 28 August 2014, he joined Celtic on a season-long loan.

Wakaso scored on his competitive debut for Celtic, netting the first in a 2–2 away draw against FC Red Bull Salzburg in the UEFA Europa League group stage. On 30 August 2015, after appearing rarely, he was loaned to UD Las Palmas for one year.

Panathinaikos
On 10 July 2016, Wakaso signed a three-year contract with Super League Greece club Panathinaikos F.C. for an undisclosed fee. On 15 September, in the last minute of a Europa League group phase home fixture against AFC Ajax, he was sent off – as teammate Ivan Ivanov midway through the second half of the eventual 1–2 home loss– and UEFA subsequently suspended him a further two games after his initial ban was over.

On 1 February 2017, Wakaso was loaned to another Spanish top-flight side, Granada CF. He scored his first goal for them on 1 March, helping to a 2–1 home win over Deportivo Alavés.

Alavés
On 17 July 2017, the day after mutually terminating his contract, Wakaso signed a three-year deal with Alavés. He scored his only competitive goal for the Basques on 18 May 2019, in a 2–1 home defeat of Girona FC who were relegated as a result.

China
Wakaso transferred to Chinese Super League side Jiangsu Suning F.C. on 18 January 2020. On 12 April of the following year, he joined Shenzhen F.C. in the same country after the former were dissolved.

International career
Wakaso represented Ghana at the 2005 FIFA U-17 World Championship in Peru, playing two matches in an eventual group stage exit (three draws). He made his full international debut on 13 October 2012, in a 2013 Africa Cup of Nations qualifier against Malawi.

On 14 November 2012, Wakaso scored his first goal in a friendly with Cape Verde. He was picked for the squad that appeared at the 2013 CAN in South Africa, notably netting the game's only goal in a group stage fixture against Mali, through a penalty kick, then scoring both in the 2–0 quarter-final win over Cape Verde.

Wakaso was selected by manager James Kwesi Appiah for his 2014 FIFA World Cup squad. He made his debut in the tournament on 21 June, playing 22 minutes in a 2–2 draw with Germany.

On 5 February 2015, Wakaso netted the second goal in Ghana's 3–0 victory against Equatorial Guinea in the semi-finals of the 2015 Africa Cup of Nations to take them to the final. In the decisive match, against the Ivory Coast, he scored his penalty shootout attempt in an eventual 9–8 loss.

Personal life
Wakaso's younger brother, Alhassan, is also a footballer and a midfielder. He spent most of his career in Portugal.

Wakaso is a practicing Muslim. In October 2018, while heading to Bilbao's Loiu airport to travel to Ghana, he was unhurt following a car accident.

Career statistics

Club

International

 Ghana score listed first, score column indicates score after each Wakaso goal.

Honours
Celtic
Scottish Premiership: 2014–15
Scottish League Cup: 2014–15

Jiangsu Suning
Chinese Super League: 2020

Ghana
Africa Cup of Nations runner-up: 2015

Individual
Africa Cup of Nations top scorer: 2013 (4 goals)
Africa Cup of Nations Team of the Tournament: 2017

References

External links

Official website

1990 births
Living people
People from Northern Region (Ghana)
Dagomba people
Ghanaian Muslims
Ghanaian footballers
Association football midfielders
Ashanti Gold SC players
La Liga players
Segunda División players
Elche CF players
Villarreal CF B players
Villarreal CF players
RCD Espanyol footballers
UD Las Palmas players
Granada CF footballers
Deportivo Alavés players
Russian Premier League players
FC Rubin Kazan players
Scottish Professional Football League players
Celtic F.C. players
Super League Greece players
Panathinaikos F.C. players
Chinese Super League players
Jiangsu F.C. players
Shenzhen F.C. players
Belgian Pro League players
K.A.S. Eupen players
Ghana international footballers
2013 Africa Cup of Nations players
2014 FIFA World Cup players
2015 Africa Cup of Nations players
2017 Africa Cup of Nations players
2019 Africa Cup of Nations players
2021 Africa Cup of Nations players
Ghanaian expatriate footballers
Expatriate footballers in Spain
Expatriate footballers in Russia
Expatriate footballers in Scotland
Expatriate footballers in Greece
Expatriate footballers in China
Expatriate footballers in Belgium
Ghanaian expatriate sportspeople in Spain
Ghanaian expatriate sportspeople in Russia
Ghanaian expatriate sportspeople in Greece
Ghanaian expatriate sportspeople in China
Ghanaian expatriate sportspeople in Belgium